Suseong SK Leader's View (Korean: 수성SK리더스뷰) is a luxury apartment complex in Daegu, South Korea, of which the two tallest twin-skyscrapers are 57-floors,  tall. Ground was broken in 2007 and the skyscrapers were topped-out in 2009, with completion in 2010.

References

Residential skyscrapers in South Korea
Buildings and structures in Daegu
Residential buildings completed in 2010
2010 establishments in South Korea